Sir Ralph Harry Robins FREng (born 16 June 1932), was the CEO of Rolls-Royce. He served 20 years on the board of Rolls-Royce, retiring in 2003 after 10 years as chairman.  After retiring from Rolls-Royce, he was appointed a non-executive director of Marshall Group in 2004.

He graduated from Imperial College London and joined Rolls-Royce as a graduate apprentice in 1955.  During his career he worked on the development of civil aero engines, was executive vice president of the company’s American operations, managing director of its Industrial and Marine Division and Commercial Director of the company. Robins is a former Chairman of the National Defence Industries Council, former President of the Society of British Aerospace Companies and a director of several international companies. He was appointed a Fellow of the Royal Academy of Engineering in 1988.  He is a Deputy Lieutenant of Derbyshire and a Freeman of the City of London.

References

Alumni of Imperial College London
Knights Bachelor
Rolls-Royce people
Living people
Deputy Lieutenants of Derbyshire
1932 births